Samy Szlingerbaum (1950–1986) was a Belgian screenwriter, actor and film director. 

Szlingerbaum began his career as a director by co-directing the 1973 film Le 15/8 with Chantal Akerman. Then in 1980 he wrote and directed Brussels Transit, a feature film in Yiddish which tells of his parents moving to Brussels and making their life there after World War II. The film starred Hélène Lapiower and Boris Lehman.

Prizes
 Brussels Transit:  (Rotterdam 81: Prix de la presse; Berlin 81: Prix de l'OCIC).

External links

1950 births
1986 deaths
Belgian film directors
Belgian Ashkenazi Jews